Nijhum Rubina is a Bangladeshi model and film actress. She was born in Bijoypur, Comilla, Bangladesh. Rubina made her career debut as a model in the television commercial of Grameen Phone in 2008. After that, she appeared many television commercial like Coffee Cap Chocolate, Sharif Melamine, Ranga Pori Mehendi, Ranga Pori Hair Oils and many others.

Career 
She made her career debut in Dhallywood by the film Er Beshi Bhalobasha Jay Na, directed by Jakir Hossain Raju in 2013 with Dhallywood actor Symon Sadik. It was her first commercial success movie. In 2014, her another film Onek Shadhonar Pore, directed by Abul Kalam Azad has been released. In 2016, her romantic film Ostitto has been released.  She also acted another film named Kistir Jala, directed by Nur Mohammad Moni, but this film is not released yet. She is assigned for several Dhallywood films and several TV commercials.

Filmography 

 2013 - Er Beshi Bhalobasha Jayna
 2014 - Onek Shadhonar Pore 
 2016 - Ostitto
 Meghkonna
 Jaan Re 
 Osomapto Premer Golpo 
 Bhalobasa.Com

References

External links
 
 

Living people
Bangladeshi film actresses
Bangladeshi television actresses
Year of birth missing (living people)